USS Puffin (AMc-29) was a coastal minesweeper acquired by the U.S. Navy for the dangerous task of removing mines from minefields laid in the water to prevent ships from passing.

Puffin was built as wooden dragger Mary Jane by Snow Shipyard, Rockland, Maine, in 1936; acquired by the Navy 25 November 1940; and commissioned 2 May 1941.

World War II service 
 
She was assigned to the 1st Naval District with a homeyard of Boston, Massachusetts. From 2 May to 8 December 1941 she operated out of Boston on inshore patrol. From then until 11 May 1943, she was part of the local defense force at Portsmouth, New Hampshire. For the next nine months she continued to operate on the U.S. East Coast.

End-of-service 
 
Puffin decommissioned at Boston 18 February 1944, and, on 12 June 1944, was reclassified Small Boat No. C–13546. She was delivered at Norfolk, Virginia, to War Shipping Administration (WSA) and sold to her former owner 20 April 1945. She was struck from the Naval Vessel Register 29 July 1947.

References

External links 
 NavSource Online: Mine Warfare Vessel Photo Archive - Puffin (AMc 29) - C-13546

Ships built in Kittery, Maine
1936 ships
Minesweepers of the United States Navy
World War II minesweepers of the United States